Ayauhcihuatl was a Queen of Tenochtitlan.

Biography 
Ayauhcihuatl was born as a princess of Azcapotzalco. She was a daughter of King Tezozomoc and sister of Kings Aculnahuacatl Tzaqualcatl, Quaquapitzahuac, Epcoatl, Tzihuactlayahuallohuatzin and Maxtla. She was sent to Tenochtitlan with many attendants and was very well received. She married a king of Tenochtitlan, Huitzilihuitl, and she bore him his successor Chimalpopoca. Ayauhcihuatl and her son later visited her father.

Family tree

See also

List of Tenochtitlan rulers
Cacamacihuatl

Notes

External links

Tenochca nobility
Queens of Tenochtitlan
Nobility of the Americas